The Triumph sprung hub is a motorcycle suspension unit contained within a rear wheel hub.  It was designed by Triumph engineer Edward Turner to give Triumph's existing rigid frames the option of rear suspension. It was one of the first motorcycle components to have a safety warning cast into its housing.

Design and development
Edward Turner designed Triumph's sprung hub in 1938. The design was inspired by Dowty hubs with suspension within them, as used in the fixed landing gear of Gloster Gladiator fighter aircraft. Turner's design used a plunger-type suspension made small enough to fit inside the wheel hub. With one spring above the rear axle and two below, the sprung hub provided about two inches of vertical travel and weighed  more than a conventional hub. It was designed to allow rear suspension to be offered optionally without altering Triumph's existing frames. The sprung hub did not provide a drive gear for the speedometer, so the design of the transmission was revised to provide the required drive gear.

Frank Baker, the head of the Experimental Department at Triumph, tried to convince Turner that the handling of Triumph motorcycles at the time the sprung hub was available was potentially dangerous at speed, to the point of having himself filmed while riding one of them on a test track at speed. Turner ignored Baker's efforts and continued with the sprung hub.

Reception
Turner had intended to introduce the sprung hub with Triumph's 1940 motorcycles, but the outbreak of the Second World War prevented this; the sprung hub was ultimately introduced in 1946. The Mk. 2 version replaced the original in 1951. While the original version was provided with a grease nipple, the Mk. The sprung hub was the only rear suspension offered with Triumph's parallel-twin motorcycles until 1955.

Legacy
The sprung hub is remembered as one of the first motorcycle products to have a safety warning cast into its housing. It is also remembered for inadequacy, being described as "a pain in the rear end" and "one of the weirdest and worst rear suspension systems of all time."

References
Citations

Bibliography

Motorcycle suspension technology